Hoskin is a surname. Notable people with the name include:

 Ashley Hoskin English footballer
 Chuck Hoskin Jr. (born 1974/1975), tribal nation chief
 Chuck Hoskin (born 1952), politician and father of Chuck Hoskin Jr.
 Cyril Henry Hoskin (1910–1981), pen name Lobsang Rampa, author of The Third Eye
 David Hoskin (born 1935), New Zealand cricketer and administrator
 John Hoskin (1921-1990), British sculptor
 Richard Hoskin (born 1959), New Zealand cricketer and administrator
 Sheila Hoskin (born 1936), English track and field athlete

See also
 Haskin (surname)
 Hoskins, surname